"Deeper Deeper/Nothing Helps" is the eighth single by Japanese rock band ONE OK ROCK. It was released on January 9, 2013 under A-Sketch label. It peaked at #3 on Billboard Japan Hot 100. The single also charted at second place on the Oricon charts and stayed for nine weeks.

"Deeper Deeper" was featured in Suzuki Swift Sport commercial in Japan, while "Nothing Helps" was used in the Japanese version of the PS3/Xbox 360 video game DmC: Devil May Cry.

Composition and lyrics 
"Deeper Deeper" is a fast tempo song, composed by drummer Tomoya alongside bassist Ryota and mixed by John Feldmann. It starts with loud bass and drum beats as vocalist Taka's throat-clear and screams amplify the intro. The song's lyrics were written by Taka and invites listeners to keep pushing life by exploring something new, because being trapped in comfort and silence will only make life feel less meaningful.

The second track "Nothing Helps" written in all English lyrics. It was composed by the band and the lyrics written by Taka, dedicate to fans, contains a message that can be taken as the belief and determination to "keep moving forward" through their musical activities.

The last track "Kasabuta" was composed and written by Taka, a powerful ballad depicts the wounds received in the past and the feeling of emptiness that cannot be wiped off. The lyrics were written mostly in Japanese with only four words in English.

Music video 
The music video for "Deeper Deeper" was released on January 7, 2013, two days before the single was released. Directed by Takahide Ishii, it features the band playing in an abandoned prison. At the same location, a child is followed by a mysterious floating iron ball. After being followed for a long time, the child finally meets the boss then faces and defeats it. At the end of the video, the child meets someone who resembles him.

Track listing 
All songs were written by Taka.

Personnel
One Ok Rock
 Takahiro "Taka" Moriuchi — lead vocals
 Toru Yamashita — lead guitar, rhythm guitar
 Ryota Kohama — bass guitar
 Tomoya Kanki — drums, percussion

Production
 Akkin — arranger
 Kenichi Arai — engineering
 Takashi Kagami — engineering
 John Feldmann — mixing 
 Kazutaka Minemori — bass technician
 Yoshiro "Masuo" Arimatsu — drum technician, guitar

Charts

Single

Songs

References 

2013 songs
2013 singles
One Ok Rock songs
Songs written by Takahiro Moriuchi
A-Sketch singles